Polonia Środa Wielkopolska is a football club in Środa Wielkopolska, Greater Poland Voivodeship. Polonia Środa competes in the III liga, group II. They play home games at the CSiR Stadion Średzki. The club also has field hockey and handball teams, and in the past had an interest in tennis.

History
Polonia Środa Wielkopolska is a sports club that was founded 1 October 1919. The first president was Adam Pankowski. In the second half of 1923, the club was caught up in financial trouble and in an attempt to rescue the club, chairman Tadeusz Mikolajczak changed the name from "Polonia" to "Tabromik." The entity survived until 1930. On 28 November 1926, a group of former activists of "Polonia" convened a meeting to revive the club. President of the new entity was Stefan Kujawski and the name was changed to "pursuit" Środa Wielkopolska.

With the advent of World War II, the club suspended all activities. On 14 April 1945, a meeting was held which established the średzki Sports Club and on 9 June the name of "Polonia" was restored. In the 50s' the club name was changed - initially it was named "Union" and later "Kolejarz" Środa Wielkopolska. In 1957, the name was changed back to "Polonia".

"Polonia" quickly advanced to league three, in which it played until 1995. In the 1989/1990 season, players advanced to the Class of the District, and two years later to the macro-regional classes. As a result of the merger with the team of Kornik, średzianie rozgywkach III debuted in the league in 1993. Their stay in the Third Polish league lasted 4 years. From this period, the players managed to get the Polish Cup twice at the national level. In 2011 the club gained promotion to the III liga.

Club honours
 3rd place III liga 2011/2012, Grupa: Kujawsko-Pomorsko - Wielkopolska
 Champions of IV Ligi Wielkopolskiej (group: Mid-North) Promotion to III Ligi (group: Kujawsko-Pomorsko-Wielkopolska) in 2010/11
 Champions of Klasa Okręgowa 2008/2009, Grupa: Poznań (Wschód)
 6 seasons in the III Liga (1993/1994, 1994/1995, 1995/1996, 1996/1997, 2011/2012, 2012/2013)
 Poznański Polish Cup (1999/2000, 2008/2009)

Current squad

References

External links
 

Association football clubs established in 1919
Multi-sport clubs in Poland
KS Polonia Środa Wielkopolska
KS Polonia Środa Wielkopolska